Leonardo Marcelo Morales (born 23 January 1987) is an Argentine professional footballer who plays as a midfielder for Primera B Metropolitana side Villa San Carlos.

Career
Morales made his professional debut for Estudiantes on 7 October 2006 in a 3-0 away win against Lanús. He then went on to play for Arsenal de Sarandí, though he did not participate in any first team game during his one-year stay.

In 2007, he played two games for the Argentina under-20 team during the South American Youth Championship.

References

External links
 Argentine Primera statistics at Fútbol XXI  
 Statistics at BDFA 
 

1987 births
Living people
Sportspeople from Corrientes Province
Argentine footballers
Association football midfielders
Estudiantes de La Plata footballers
Arsenal de Sarandí footballers
Atlético de Rafaela footballers
Expatriate footballers in Bolivia